Municipal elections were held in the Canadian province of New Brunswick on 28 November 2022 to elect local governments in newly formed municipalities following the 2023 New Brunswick local governance reform process. The new municipalities will come into existence on 1 January 2023. In total, there will be elections for 50 new municipalities and 12 rural districts, with a total of 446 elected positions. Of the 446 positions, 148 seats were elected by acclamation. Four spots had no candidates at all and will be filled with by-elections in May 2023. Elections are not being held in larger municipalities such as Moncton, Saint John and Fredericton which did not go through the government reform.

Results for select municipalities are as follows:

Beaurivage
The results for mayor of Beaurivage are as follows:

Beausoleil
The results for mayor of Beausoleil are as follows:

Belle-Baie
The results for mayor of Belle-Baie are as follows:

Butternut Valley
The results for mayor of Butternut Valley are as follows:

Campbellton
Incumbent Campbellton mayor Ian Comeau ran against Atholville mayor Jean-Guy Levesque.

The results for mayor of Campbellton are as follows:

Cap-Acadie
Louise Landry, the mayor of Beaubassin East ran for mayor. 

The results for mayor of Cap-Acadie are as follows:

Caraquet
The results for mayor of Caraquet are as follows:

Carleton North
The results for mayor of the District of Carleton North are as follows:

Central York
The results for mayor of Central York are as follows:

Champdoré
The results for mayor of Champdoré are as follows:

Eastern Charlotte
The results for mayor of Eastern Charlotte are as follows:

Fundy Albert
The results for mayor of Fundy Albert are as follows:

Fundy-St. Martins
The results for mayor of Fundy-St. Martins are as follows:

Grand-Bouctouche
The results for mayor of Grand-Bouctouche are as follows:

Grand Falls
School district director general Bertrand Beaulieu was elected by acclamation.

The results for mayor of Grand Falls are as follows:

Grand Lake
The results for mayor of Grand Lake are as follows:

Hampton
The results for mayor of Hampton are as follows:

Hautes-Terres
The results for mayor of Hautes-Terres are as follows:

Heron Bay
Dalhousie mayor Normand Pelletier was elected mayor. He defeated Charlo mayor Gaétan Pelletier and Dalhousie councillor Gail Fearon.

The results for mayor of Heron Bay are as follows:

Île-de-Lamèque
The results for mayor of Île-de-Lamèque are as follows:

Maple Hills
The results for mayor of Maple Hills are as follows:

Miramichi River Valley
The results for mayor of Miramichi River Valley are as follows:

Salisbury
The results for mayor of Salisbury are as follows:

St. Stephen
The results for mayor of the Municipal District of St. Stephen are as follows:

Sunbury-York South
The results for mayor of Sunbury-York South are as follows:

Sussex
The results for mayor of Sussex are as follows:

Tantramar
Shawn Mesheau, the mayor of Sackville ran for mayor. 

The results for mayor of Tantramar are as follows:

Woodstock
Incumbent Woodstock mayor Arthur Slipp ran against Town councillor Trina Milbury (Jones). 

The results for mayor of Woodstock are as follows:

References

External links
Results website

Municipal elections in New Brunswick
New Brunswick municipal
2022 in New Brunswick
November 2022 events in Canada
2023 New Brunswick local governance reform